Köszönöm, megvagyunk is a 1981 Hungarian drama film directed by László Lugossy. It was entered into the 31st Berlin International Film Festival.

Cast
 József Madaras - B. József
 Júlia Nyakó - Éva (as Nyakó Juli)
 Lajos Szabó - Béla bácsi
 Ágnes Kakassy - Béla bácsi felesége (as Kakassy Ági)
 Ferenc Bács - Müvezetõ
 Myrtill Madaras - József's daughter
 Miklós Zoltai - Supervisor
 Vilmos Kun - Orvos
 Erzsi Benkocs - Munkáslány (as Benkócs Erzsébet)
 József Lajtos - Rendõr
 Albert Lovassy - Mentõorvos (uncredited)

References

External links

1981 films
Hungarian drama films
1980s Hungarian-language films
1981 drama films
Films directed by László Lugossy